The Journal of Bioethical Inquiry is a quarterly peer-reviewed academic journal covering bioethics that was established in 2004. It is published by Springer Science+Business Media and the editors-in-chief are Michael A. Ashby (University of Tasmania) and Bronwen Morrell (University of Sydney).

Abstracting and indexing
The journal is abstracted and indexed in:

According to the Journal Citation Reports, the journal has a 2019 impact factor of 1.425.

References

External links

Bioethics journals
English-language journals
Publications established in 2004
Springer Science+Business Media academic journals
Quarterly journals